Julus may refer to:

Ascanius, also known as Julus, a king in Roman mythology
Julus (millipede), a genus of millipedes in the family Julidae